Melese sixola is a moth of the family Erebidae. It was described by William Schaus in 1910. It is found in Costa Rica.

Subspecies
Melese sixola sixola
Melese sixola frater Schaus, 1910

References

Melese
Moths described in 1910
Arctiinae of South America